The Best That I Could Do 1978–1988 is the first greatest hits compilation album by American singer-songwriter John Mellencamp, released by Mercury Records in 1997 (see 1997 in music). It compiles Mellencamp's most popular material recorded during his first decade with Riva and Mercury Records, beginning with 1978's A Biography, up through 1987's The Lonesome Jubilee, with a new recording of Terry Reid's "Without Expression". Mellencamp picked the songs for the album and also came up with the title for the album. The album reached No. 33 on the Billboard 200. This album and Rough Harvest came about because, after leaving Mercury Records for Columbia Records, Mellencamp still owed the label two more albums.

Reception

Stephen Thomas Erlewine of AllMusic.com said that the album's title was suitable and while it did not include all of Mellencamp's hits, it is a good summary of Mellencamp's "remarkably consistent" work. Robert Christgau described it as the best of John Mellencamp, which to him is not saying much. Entertainment Weekly gave the album a "B" rating, describing it as "uncomplicated but sophisticated."

Track listing

Original release

Japanese edition
The version released in Japan features two additional songs ("Miami" and a cover of "Under the Boardwalk," tracks 2 and 15, respectively), and places "Lonely Ol' Night" before "Authority Song".

Personnel
Adapted from the album's liner notes.

John Mellencamp (a.k.a. "Little Bastard" on some tracks) – vocals, guitar, songwriter, producer
Larry Crane – guitars, harmonica, background vocals, flutophone
Tom Knowles – drums on "I Need a Lover"
Robert "Ferd" Frank – bass, background vocals on "I Need a Lover"
Brian Bekvar – keyboards on "I Need a Lover"
John Punter – producer, engineer on "I Need a Lover"
Rick Shlosser – drums on "Ain't Even Done with the Night"
Mike Wanchic – guitars, background vocals; producer on "Without Expression"
Kenny Aronoff – vibes on "Ain't Even Done with the Night", drums, background vocals, hammer dulcimer
Eric Rosser – keyboards
Steve Cropper – producer on "Ain't Even Done with the Night"
Bruce Robb – engineer on "Ain't Even Done with the Night"
Dee Robb – engineer on "Ain't Even Done with the Night"
George "Chocolate" Perry – bass on "Hurts So Good"
Dave Parman – background vocals on "Hurts So Good"
Don Gehman – producer/engineer on "Hurts So Good" thru "Check It Out"
George Tutko – engineer on "Hurts So Good"
Mick Ronson – guitar and background vocals on "Jack and Diane"
Toby Myers – bass, background vocals
Carroll Sue Hill – keyboards, background vocals
Greg Edward – engineer
David Thoener – engineer on "Pink Houses"
Sarah Flint – background vocals on "R.O.C.K. in the U.S.A."
John Cascella – keyboards, accordion
Lisa Germano – violin
Pat Peterson – background vocals
Crystal Taliefero – background vocals
Dane Clark – drums on "Without Expression"
Miriam Sturm – violin on "Without Expression"
Andy York – guitars, background vocals on "Without Expression"
Moe Z – keyboards, background vocals on "Without Expression"
Corsillo/Manzobe-Design Monsters – art direction
Paul Jasmin – photography

Charts

Weekly charts

Year-end charts

Certifications

References

1997 greatest hits albums
John Mellencamp compilation albums
Albums produced by Don Gehman
Albums produced by Steve Cropper
Mercury Records compilation albums